Blackwater is the fifth studio album by Altan, released in April 1996 on the Virgin Records label. Three of the songs are sung in Irish. "Ar Bhruach Na Carraige Baine" is sung partly in English and in Irish. "Blackwaterside" is sung in English. It was the first album released by the band since the death of founding member Frankie Kennedy two years earlier. The final track on the album is a tribute to Kennedy and was written by Mairéad Ní Mhaonaigh herself.

Track listing
 "Johnny Boyle's/King of the Pipers" (Jigs) (Trad/Trad) (Instr) - 3.30
 "Dark Haired Lass/Biddy From Muckross/Sean Maguire's" (Reels) (Trad/Trad/Trad) (Instr) - 2:51
 "Stór, A Stór, A Ghrá" (song) (Traditional) (Irish) - 2:51
 "Strathspey/Con McGinley's/The Newfoundland Reel" (Strathspey and Reels) (Trad/Trad/Trad) (Instr) -3:11
 "Tá Mé 'Mo Shuí (I am awake)" (song) (Traditional) (Gaelic) - 4:08
 "An Gasúr Mor/Bunker Hill/Dogs Among the Bushes" (Hornpipe and Reels) (Trad/Trad/Trad) (Instr) - 2:36
 "Molly Na gCuach Ní Chuilleanáin (The curly haired Molly)"(song) (Traditional) (Irish) - 2:35
 "Jenny Picking Cockles/Farewell to Leitrim/John Doherty's" (Reels) (Trad/Trad/Trad) (Instr) - 2:41
 "Ar Bhruach Na Carraige Báine" (song) (Traditional) (sung in English and Irish) - 2:38
 "The Dance of the Honeybees" (hornpipe) (Charlie Lennon) (Instr) - 3:24
 "Blackwaterside" (song) (Traditional) (English) - 3:43
 "A Tune for Frankie" (jig) (Mairéad Ní Mhaonaigh) - 3:25

Personnel

Altan
Mairéad Ní Mhaonaigh – Fiddle, vocals
Ciaran Tourish – Fiddle, whistle, backing vocals
Dermot Byrne – Accordion, melodeon
Ciarán Curran – Bouzouki
Mark Kelly – Guitar, backing vocals
Dáithí Sproule – Guitar, backing vocals

Guest musicians
Steve Cooney – Bass (tracks 7, 9, 10, 12), backing vocals (tracks 3, 7)
Conan Doyle – Backing vocals (track 3)
Jimmy Higgins – Bodhrán (tracks 1, 3, 5), darrbuka (track 8), snare drum (track 7), wood block (track 9), clay drums (track 3)
Dónal Lunny – Bouzouki (track 10), bodhrán (tracks 4, 7, 9, 12), keyboards (tracks 5, 7, 9, 12)
Maighréad Ní Dhomhnaill – Backing vocals (track 3)
Tríona Ní Dhomhnaill – Backing vocals (track 3), piano (track 11)
Anna Ní Mhaonaigh – Backing vocals (track 7)
Brendan Power –  Harmonica (tracks 3, 7, 9)
String quartet:
Máire Breatnach — Viola
Annette Cleary — Cello
David James — Cello
Tommy Kane — Violin

Production
Brian Masterson – Producer, Engineer
David Scheinmann – Photography
The Design Corporation – Design

References
Notes

External links
 - Official video

Altan (band) albums
1996 albums
Irish-language albums
Virgin Records albums